The Oxford Township School District is a community public school district that serves students in pre-kindergarten through eighth grade from Oxford Township in Warren County, New Jersey, United States.

As of the 2018–19 school year, the district, comprising one school, had an enrollment of 275 students and 30.0 classroom teachers (on an FTE basis), for a student–teacher ratio of 9.2:1.

The district is classified by the New Jersey Department of Education as being in District Factor Group "DE", the fifth-highest of eight groupings. District Factor Groups organize districts statewide to allow comparison by common socioeconomic characteristics of the local districts. From lowest socioeconomic status to highest, the categories are A, B, CD, DE, FG, GH, I and J.

Public school students in seventh through twelfth grades attend the schools of the Warren Hills Regional School District, which also serves students from the municipalities of Franklin Township, Mansfield Township, Washington Borough and Washington Township, along with those from Oxford who attend for grades 9-12 only on a tuition basis as part of a sending/receiving relationship. Schools in the district (with 2018–19 enrollment data from the National Center for Education Statistics) are 
Warren Hills Regional Middle School with 542 students in grades 7 and 8 (located in Washington Borough) and 
Warren Hills Regional High School with 1,205 students in grades 9 - 12 (located in Washington Township).

School
Oxford Central School had an enrollment of 274 students in grades PreK-8 in the 2018–19 school year.

Despite the small size of the school, it has won the New Jersey state archery championship in the Middle School Division every year from 2007 to 2015.

Administration
Core members of the school's administration are:
Robert Magnuson, Chief School Administrator
Nancy DeRiso, Business Administrator / Board Secretary

Board of education
The district's board of education, comprised of seven members, sets policy and oversees the fiscal and educational operation of the district through its administration. As a Type II school district, the board's trustees are elected directly by voters to serve three-year terms of office on a staggered basis, with either two or three seats up for election each year held (since 2012) as part of the November general election. The board appoints a superintendent to oversee the day-to-day operation of the district.

References

External links
Oxford Township School District

School Data for the Oxford Township School District, National Center for Education Statistics
Warren Hills Regional School District

Oxford Township, New Jersey
New Jersey District Factor Group DE
School districts in Warren County, New Jersey
Public K–8 schools in New Jersey